Think Fast is an American children's game show which aired on Nickelodeon from May 1, 1989, to March 30, 1990, with reruns airing weekly until June 29, 1991.

For the first season, the show was hosted by Michael Carrington, and announced by James Eoppolo. When the show moved to the new Nickelodeon Studios in Orlando, Florida, for season two, Carrington was replaced by Skip Lackey. While Eoppolo was invited to stay on as announcer, he was contractually obligated to another project by that time, and was replaced by Henry J. Waleczko. The show's theme music was composed by Edd Kalehoff.

Season 1 had 65 episodes taped in Philadelphia, Pennsylvania. The Tampa Tribune initially reported that 45 episodes of Season 2 were taped in Orlando, Florida. However, only 41 episodes were produced.

Gameplay
Two teams of two (one of them wearing gold, another wearing blue) competed in various events. The team that completed each stunt won money ($50 for Round 1, $100 for Round 2). In both seasons, it was possible for some events to end in a draw, whether by both teams failing to complete a stunt, or by a tie score. When both teams failed, no money was awarded to either team. With a tie score, the money was awarded to each team. Also in season one, some events required a team to buzz in when they were done. If a team buzzed in without completing the event properly, the other team won.

Events
 Simon-type games – Contestants had to repeat in order a sequence of events, adding one event of their own to the sequence. The first team to get any item in the sequence wrong or run out of time (or, in season one, forgetting to add an item) lost the event. Examples of Simon games included the following:
 We've Got Your Number (later renamed "Close Calls") – contestants had to punch in a sequence of numbers on a large telephone.
 Pat the Uncle (later renamed "Burp the Uncle") – contestants had to push down on the shoulders of three fat "uncles", making them belch violently. The "uncles" were enormously fat men who snacking on bowls of random food items which included popcorn, tortilla chips, candy and Pepto-Bismol.
 Paint Catcher – each team had a "pitcher" with a bucket of paint-filled balloons, and a "catcher" who wore a body shield composed of an abrasive material. Each team had to take turns throwing red, yellow, green, or blue paint balloons at his opponent in sequence.
 Sound on Sound– a number of noisemaking objects was placed on a table; each team had to make noises with the noisemakers in sequence.
 One Man Band – Each contestant wore a one-man band set complete with several instruments such as: drums, cymbals, horns, etc. Each contestant had to play their instruments in sequence.
 Banana Splitsville – Each contestant had a large ice cream sundae and a selection of toppings. Each contestant had to put toppings on their sundaes in sequence.
 Flog – The name of this event was "golf" spelled backwards. A miniature golf hole was set up in the studio, and to be able to putt, contestants had to observe a word spelled backwards and tell what the correct word was when spelled correctly. The team who made it into the hole first won. Occasionally, palindromes were thrown in to catch the contestants off guard.
 Plumber's Blackjack – The goal of this event was for one contestant to pour random containers of colored water into a larger container over the other contestant's head. The teams took turns, with the goal to get to a marked line on the large container without going over (unlike Double Dare). They first draw cards then pour the container with the same number that was on their chosen card. If a team went past the line, the other team won automatically. The container was perforated along the marked line, so that if a team busted, the excess water poured out over the seated teammate's head.
 Weight and Seesaw – Each contestant was placed on one side of a balance, with random household objects having a combined weight heavier than the contestant on the other side. Teams raced against each other removing items attempting to balance the scale within a range. If a team took too much off the scale, the contestant outweighed the objects onto the other side and descend into a large bowl filled with slime. The first team to balance the scale won the event. In season one, each team competed individually, and the first team played with the clock counting up to a maximum of 45 seconds. If the first team failed, the other team still had to balance the scale before time ran out in order to claim the money.
 America's Most Wanted Clowns – The host began explaining complex rules to a bizarre event when an outlandishly-dressed clown suddenly ran through the studio. The real event was for the contestants to answer questions dealing with what the clown was wearing. The team answering the most questions correctly won.
 Basketball-type games: – Contestants had to shoot balls into baskets, either of which corresponded to answers of a question or set of questions. Variations included:
 Color Hoops - A giant basketball goal was set up above a large tube, with a number of colored rubber balls to its side. Each tube had a phrase with a color word left out (example, "___ mountains majesty"). The contestants had to shoot the plastic balls through the hoop and into the tube to correctly match the colors with the phrases. The most correct phrases won the event.
 Noisy Toss - Ten small hoops were mounted to a giant backboard with their nets tied closed. each of which corresponded to the name of a sound effect. Six of the sound effects were played, after which the contestants had 30 seconds to shoot basketballs into the hoops corresponding to the correct sounds. The team with the most baskets with correct answers filled won the event.
Fruit Machine Games: - Contestants are presented a fruit machine which has either phrases or faces on it. The contestants must lineup the phrases or faces by saying the number or letter that corresponds with the matching phrase or face. The team with the most phrases or faces guessed won.
As the Word Turns- Contestants are presented a fruit machine which has 3 word phrases on it. The contestants must lineup the phrases by saying the number that corresponds with the matching phrase. The team with the most phrases guessed won.
Turnstile Justice- Contestants are presented a fruit machine which faces on it. The contestants must lineup the faces by saying the letter that corresponds with the matching face. The team with the most faces guessed won.
 This is to That – Contestants faced a board of anagrams (scrambled words). The host gave a series of analogies in which the last word in the phrase was located somewhere on the board scrambled. When an analogy was given, the contestant buzzed in and ran up to the board to unscramble the right word. The contestant who successfully unscrambled the most words won the event.
 Categorically Speaking – A letter was given at the start, then a category was given by the host (a la Scattergories). The first contestant to buzz in gave an answer that began with that set letter and fit the category. Then the opposing contestant did the same. Contestants continued to alternate turns until one contestant either gave an answer that did not fit the category and/or begin with the set letter, repeated a word (including different forms of a word), or ran out of time. For each mistake a contestant made, his opponent scored one point, and the contestant with the most points won the event.
 Juggling Letters- The contestants are given a board of 5 letters. The first contestant to buzz in made a word out of the letters. . Then the opposing contestant did the same. Contestants continued to alternate turns until one contestant either gave a word that wasn't accepted, repeated a word (including different forms of a word), or ran out of time. For each mistake a contestant made, his opponent scored one point, and the contestant with the most points won the event.
 Word Search – Contestants had to find words in a puzzle based on clues given by the host (the words usually had a theme, e.g. animals); correctly finding a word resulted in the contestant being able to pour a bucket of slop into a pipe with a funnel. The team that filled their pipe first won the event.
 Leaning Tower of Things – Both teams were given an identical assortment of objects, and had 60 seconds to build as tall a freestanding structure as they could using those objects. The structures still had to remain standing on their own for three seconds after the time buzzer sounded; the team with the tallest structure won the event.
 The Feelies – One teammate handed their blindfolded partner an object, and gave a one-word clue to identity the object. The team that identified more objects in a faster time won the event.
 Gasward- One teammate gave their blindfolded partner a smell, and gave a one-word clue as to identity the object. The team that identified the more smells won the event.
 Sounding Board- One teammate played a second for the blindfolded contestants. The blindfolded will buzz in and try to identity the item. The team that identified the more sounds won the event.
 Leaping Letters – One teammate placed letters on a catapult and launched them towards their partner, who had to catch the letters in the air and put them on the board to form words of at least 2 letters (proper words were not allowed). The team that made the most words in 90 seconds (60 seconds in early playings) won the event (ties are broken by number of letters in their valid words).
 Mind Boggling – Each team is given a large pile of cubes with a letter on each side. The teams place the cubes in their grids in a criss-crossing fashion in an effort to make as many words as they can. The team that makes the most valid words, or, if both teams have the same number of words, the team that uses more letters in their valid words in 60 seconds won the event.
 Frankenstein- One player from each team will throw switches up or down to test Frankenstein, the first one to wake Frankenstein won.
 Charades- One player from each team will act out an activity, the contestants will then buzz in to guess the activity. The team with the most points won the event.
 Market Madness – Each team has 3 shelves with all its items mixed up, and each shelf has a scrambled marker that shows what belongs on that shelf (cereal on the top shelf, fruit on the middle and snacks on the bottom). With one contestant riding in a shopping cart, teams push their teammates to the markers to unscramble them, and then they must put all the items on their proper shelves, buzzing in when their done. First team to buzz in with everything sorted out correctly won.
 Frosty The Junkman – Each team has an identical pile of junk and a snowman named Frosty. The host sings a parody of "Frosty The Snowman" and then the teams have 45 seconds to use the junk to dress up Frosty  as described in the song they just heard. The team with the most correct junk on Frosty won.
 Wipe Out – Each team has a gunked up celebrity poster and some wet sponges. Teams throw the sponges at the poster to clean it off. Once they know who the celebrity in the picture is, they must buzz in. The first team to buzz in with the correct celebrity won.
 Jack's Be Nimble – One teammate is standing in front of a large board while their partners are standing next to a pile of balloons filled with shaving cream and letters and a red beach ball. The host will give out a phrase that each team needs to spell out on the board and their partners will throw the red ball up into the air and until it hits the ground, like in jacks, they must throw balloons to their partners who must break them and stick the letters inside them on the boards to spell out the phrase. The first team to spell out the phrase won the event.
 Mess Heads – One teammate must identify a food that the host is describing. Once identified, the contestant gets to pour a scoop of slop into a paper bag suspended above their partner's head. The first team to fill the bag with enough slop to make the bag's bottom break above their partner's head won the event.
 Searching Games- Each team will be given a food item filled with letters. Teams will open the item and stick the letters on the board to spell out a name or phrase. The first time to correctly spell out the phrase won the event.
 Movie Marquee – Each team has a marquee and some buckets filled with popcorn and letters, each spelling out a word in a movie title. Teams must dump out the popcorn and stick the letters on their marquee to spell out the movie title. The first team to correctly spell out the movie title won the event.
 Fortune Cookies- Each team has a board and some fortune cookie filled with letters, each spelling out a phrase . Teams must crack open the fortune cookies and stick the letters on their board to spell out the phrase. The first team to correctly put the words in the correct order won the event.
 Scrambling Phrases- Each team has a board and some giant eggs filled with letters, each spelling out a phrase . Teams must crack open the eggs and stick the letters on their board to spell out the phrase. The first team to correctly put the words in the correct order won the event.
 Birthday Cake- Each team has a board and some birthday cake filled with scrabble tiles, each spelling out the name of a birthday gift. Teams must destroy the cake and stick the letters on their board to spell out the gift(each title has a number on the bottom, showing the order in which the letters are place). The first team to correctly spell out the gift won the event.
 Alphabet Soup – A big bowl of alphabet soup is placed in the middle of the floor and each team has an identical menu with some missing letters. One contestant will fish a letter out of the soup and pass it to their partner who must place the letter in its proper spot on the menu. The first team to correctly complete their menu won.
 Altered States – Each team has an unfinished 3-D jigsaw puzzle of the United States, with each piece being a U.S. state. Teams have to complete their puzzle by placing the remaining pieces in their proper spots. The first team to finish their puzzle won.
 Safe Crackers – Each team has a safe with an item locked inside of it that needed to be handed to their partner. The safe's combination was the answer to a crazy math problem that the host gave each team to solve(example: number of days in a leap year(366) plus the number of obstacles on Double Dare's obstacle course(8) minus the number of people living in the Brady Bunch house, including Alice(9), 366+8-9=365). The first team to crack the safe's code and hand their partner the item inside won.
 Card House – Each team has a set of playing cards and a bowl of glue. The host will show the teams a card house that they must duplicate using their cards and the glue provided. The house must be an exact copy of the host's model based on which cards were used and their positions. The first team to complete their card house won.
 Heavyweight Boxing – Each team has an identical pile of boxes of various shapes and sizes. Teams must place their smallest box into a slightly bigger box and then that box into the next biggest box, and so on until all their boxes are in one big box. The first team to finish won.
 The Absent Minded Chef – A clueless chef will come with several bags containing ingredients to a meal, but the chef can't remember what meal the items in each bag make. The chef will select a bag and pull out ingredients out of that bag one at a time until the team buzzes in with the meal those items make. The team who identifies the most meals won.
 Space Art – Each team has a 4x4 grid of spinning blocks with different colored sides. The teams are shown an image that they must copy on their grid by spinning the blocks to the corresponding colored side. The first team to recreate the image on their grid won.
 Memory Match – The teams study a board with different answers, each with a corresponding number. The answers are covered up after 10 seconds and then the host will describe an answer on the board. The contestant must buzz in and shout that answer's number, much like Get The Picture's Mega Memory round. The team with the most correct answers won.
 Egg Me On – One contestant from each team must help their partner, who is blindfolded and dressed as a chicken with large feet, walk across a field of color-coded eggs(gold for the gold team and blue for the blue team). The contestants being guided cannot touch their partners or break any of the opposing teams eggs or that team will be disqualified. The team to make it across the field with the fewest broken eggs won.
 Behind The Teacher's Back – Teams are sitting at desks with rolls of paper and bowls of water to make spit wads. A teacher will ask one of the teams questions until the team gets one right, at which point the teacher will ask questions to the other team. While one team is being asked questions, the other team gets to throw their spit wads onto a target on a chalkboard behind the teacher. The team with the most spit wads on the target won.
 Convicted Felons - Six "suspects" are standing in front of a wall mocked up to look like that sometimes used as a background for a police lineup. One member of each team chooses three of the six suspects to draw, and has 30 seconds to draw those three suspects on the outside of file folders while their partner is in isolation. After time expires (and the drawing players have identified their chosen suspects by writing their numbers on the insides of the file folders), their partners are brought back and are given 10 seconds to identify the three chosen suspects by handing each selection the appropriate drawing. The team with the most correct matches won.
 Spilling Bee - One player from each team is placed in front of a series of labeled containers, each of which has an incorrect item in it (for instance, a container labeled "golf balls" may have feathers in it instead). One of the containers is empty and can be used to transfer items. The first team to transfer all of the items to the correct containers, or, failing that, the team with the most containers with the correct items when time is called, wins.
 Paper Route – One contestant is at the podium while their partner stands next to a newsstand with several different headlines and newspapers. The host will describe one of the headlines for the team to identify. Correctly identifying the headline earned the team a point plus their partner got a chance for an extra point by throwing a newspaper into a bucket on a front porch, which the host usually demonstrated by accidentally throwing the newspaper through the porch window. The team with the most points won the event.
 Smelly Garbage – Each team has a pile of garbage and an identical assortment of trash cans and bags, each a different size. Teams must first place the bags into the appropriately sized cans, then they must place the garbage into the trash cans. The first team to fill each of their trash cans to the top with the garbage won.
 Chores – The host read a list of chores for the teams to do in a certain order, but those chores were read in a random order. For instance, the host might say, "The second chore is to put Jello in a dog food bowl and dog food in a Jello bowl; the first chore is to stack plates and bowls in an alternating order, the fourth chore is to unroll an entire roll of toilet paper and put the paper in a hat, and the third chore is to sweep all of the banana peels off a rug using a shovel." The team had to stack the dishes, then place the Jello and the dog food in the stated bowls, then sweep the banana peels from the rug, then unroll the toilet paper and put it in the hat. Once the team has completed all four chores, they buzz in. The team only wins if they completed the chores in the correct order.
 Pictures at an Exhibition Both teams must put all the paintings in the correct spots to spell out a related phrase/question. First team to do that correctly wins.
 Bits and Pieces The host asks a question and both teams must spell out their answer using thin bits of wood. (for example, they use two straight lines to make a T or two curvy lines to make an S.) The first team to finish with the correct answer wins.
Character Story A bizarre character was brought in and told a story to the host and teams. Afterwards, the host asks the teams questions about the story. The team with the most correct answers wins.
House of _ Both teams must find something in a basket that goes with the items on the shelf(either rhymes, homonyms or this and that). The first team to finish wins.
Pizza Party Both teams must lineup as many similar pieces of pizza as possible. The team with the most matches wins.
Three Card Chicken- The host will ask a question and the player who answers it correctly, will crack one of three eggs on their head as the chicken shuffles them. If they find the hard boiled one, they get the point. If they find one of the two raw eggs, the other team got the point. The team with the most points won the event.

The Think Fast Brain Bender
After each event, the winners of the event in addition to the cash won a chance to solve a visual puzzle known as the "Brain Bender". In each attempt a puzzle piece was removed. The puzzle could be a picture of a celebrity, a rebus, a close-up object or objects in common. Correctly solving a Brain Bender was worth $200. If the Brain Bender was solved in the first round, another one was started in the second half, still worth $200. If nobody solved the Brain Bender after the final event, or if a tie occurs at the end of the game, a sudden death showdown was played. Originally teams alternated turns taking guesses after each puzzle piece was removed; in later episodes, pieces were removed one at a time until one contestant buzzed in with a correct answer. Generally speaking, who ever solved the Brain Bender-won the game. On very early episodes if the puzzle was solved early in the first round, a second Brain Bender was thrown out. Usually, this puzzle was so hard or obscure, it couldn't be solved. When the Brain Bender was objects in common, a different version of the Brain Bender was used in which one of six pictures or drawings was revealed after every event. The teams had to guess what the depicted items all had in common.

The theoretical maximum a team could win upfront was $750, $150 for winning all 3 events in round 1, plus $200 for winning both events in round 2, plus another $400 for solving the brain benders in both rounds.

The team with the most money at the end of the game won and advanced to the bonus round, the Locker Room.

Locker Room
The Locker Room contained fifteen large lockers, each containing either a costumed character that distracted the contestants by bombarding them with sometimes messy surprises, or a number of themed objects (rubber balls, balloons, or small props which flew out, for example). In season one, the lockers also contained puppet characters and cannons that blasted confetti when the locker opened. A locker opened, and the contestant then had to find its match. Because of the numerous distractions and surprises that popped out of the lockers when opened, contestants were required to wear helmets, goggles, and knee/elbow pads in the Locker Room. In total, there were seven pairs of characters or objects, as well as an unpaired locker. Each match won a prize.

Every time a contestant pressed a button, the locker corresponding to that button opened up. When a contestant found a match, they had to press a button in the center of the stage that closed all the lockers as well as deactivate the buttons to the matched lockers, as they were already matched and not needed to match again.

Season one
The first contestant had 30 seconds to find as many pairs as they could. The unpaired locker contained a Time Bomb that was "set to go off after 20 seconds". The first contestant had to deactivate the Time Bomb within the first 20 seconds by simply opening the locker containing the Time Bomb. If the first contestant found the time bomb, the second contestant also received 30 seconds to find pairs; however, if the time bomb went off (signaled by its locker opening automatically and an accompanying explosion sound), the second contestant only received 20 seconds. On very early episodes, finding the Time Bomb also added 10 seconds to the second contestant's time for a total of 40 seconds, this rule was dropped after only two or three tapings. Each match on this version was worth increasingly valuable prizes; making six matches won the team a trip. The lockers that were still able to open had the lights off (located on top of the lockers).

Season two
This time, the team took turns for each match, and the team had 60 seconds to find all seven matches. The first four matches the team split $200; the other three matches awarded prizes, with the grand prize being awarded for all seven matches. The unpaired locker contained the "Red Herring", which was simply a character with no match. At some point during the run (after any of the first six matches), the Red Herring's locker was opened. At that point, the contestant had to "yank on the Herring Handle", a cord suspended in the center of the room; the team did not get credit for a match, but they were then able to continue to the next character. When this handle was pulled, a bucket of red plastic fish toys was dropped on the character while his/her door was being locked. The unlocked lockers had lights on (located on the buttons).

Studios
The series was, like all of Nickelodeon's early game shows, taped at WHYY-TV in Philadelphia, Pennsylvania, for its first season. The show relocated to the soon-to-be-opened Universal Studios Florida in Orlando for Season Two, where the set received a makeover. The Orlando episodes of the show were taped in January 1990, 5 months before Nickelodeon Studios, as well as the rest of Universal Studios Florida, officially opened, and was the second Nickelodeon game show to tape there (Super Sloppy Double Dare was the first).

As with virtually every Nickelodeon game show produced from 1986 to 1996, the set was designed by Byron Taylor.

References

External links

 

1980s Nickelodeon original programming
1990s Nickelodeon original programming
1980s American children's game shows
1990s American children's game shows
1989 American television series debuts
1990 American television series endings
Nickelodeon game shows
Television shows filmed in Pennsylvania
Television shows filmed in Florida